Glanmire GFC is a Gaelic Athletic Association club based in Glanmire in Cork, Ireland. Its Gaelic Football team participates in competitions organized by Cork GAA, and is a member of Imokilly division. The club does not play hurling as it is closely affiliated with Sarsfields which is a separate hurling club in the area.

Achievements
 Cork Intermediate Football Championship Winners (1) 1987  Runners-Up 1981, 1985, 2005, 2006
 Cork Junior Football Championship Winners (3) 1923, 1951, 1958
 East Cork Junior A Football Championship Winners (20) 1929, 1930, 1932, 1933, 1934, 1936, 1937, 1946, 1950, 1951, 1957, 1958, 1963, 1964, 1965, 1966, 1968, 1970, 1971, 1977
 Cork Minor Football Championship Winners (1) 2020

Notable players
 Derry Beckett
 Michael Cussen
 Daniel Kearney
 Teddy McCarthy
 Bertie Óg Murphy
 Tadhg Murphy

References

Gaelic games clubs in County Cork
Gaelic football clubs in County Cork